During the 2003–04 English football season, Brentford competed in Football League Second Division. After mid-season spell of one win in 18 matches and relegation looking definite, manager Wally Downes was sacked in mid-March 2004. Martin Allen took over and immediately turned things around, pulling off "The Great Escape" to secure safety on the final day of the season.

Season summary

Cash-strapped Brentford began the 2003–04 season with a threadbare squad, depleted through injuries and propped up with youngsters, with manager Wally Downes admitting that the club's "immediate goal is keeping ourselves afloat for a period that shows the bank we can manage ourselves". Five defeats in the opening six games left the club second-from-bottom, before the integration of loanees Ben May, Tommy Wright and Joel Kitamirike yielded an improvement in form in September, going unbeaten and winning three of five matches. In October, amidst speculation that former Brentford manager Steve Perryman would return to the club as director of football, manager Wally Downes was assured that his role would not be affected. Perryman eventually turned the offer down.

Despite a morale-boosting 7–1 FA Cup first round victory over Gainsborough Trinity and four wins from six matches in October and November lifting the Bees to mid-table, the rot soon set in. After the goalkeeping position weakened by the £500,000 sale of Paul Smith in January 2004 and with just one win from 19 matches in all competitions, Wally Downes was sacked after a 2–0 home defeat to Stockport County on 13 March 2004, which was Brentford's fifth consecutive defeat. Caretaker manager Garry Thompson took charge for the away match versus Blackpool on 16 March, with a 1–1 draw securing the first point won for a month.

Former Barnet manager Martin Allen took over on 18 March 2004 and was tasked with retaining Brentford's Second Division status. Allen released a number of players, installed his own backroom team and immediately galvanised the squad, winning three and drawing three of his first six matches to lift the Bees above the relegation places. A priceless point salvaged at already-relegated Wycombe Wanderers on 24 April kept the Bees above the relegation places, but a 1–0 defeat away to fellow strugglers Grimsby Town in the penultimate match of the season meant the club would need to secure safety on the final day with a victory over Bournemouth or favourable results elsewhere. The match versus Bournemouth at Griffin Park remained scoreless until seven minutes from time, when substitute Alex Rhodes "coolly slotted" past Cherries' goalkeeper Neil Moss for a 1–0 win that completed Brentford's escape from relegation.

League table

Results
Brentford's goal tally listed first.

Legend

Pre-season

Football League Second Division

FA Cup

Football League Cup

Football League Trophy

 Sources: Soccerbase, 11v11

Playing squad 
Players' ages are as of the opening day of the 2003–04 season.

 Source: Soccerbase

Coaching staff

Wally Downes (9 August 2003 – 14 March 2004)

Garry Thompson (14 – 18 March 2004)

Martin Allen (18 March – 8 May 2004)

Statistics

Appearances and goals
Substitute appearances in brackets.

 Players listed in italics left the club mid-season.
 Source: Soccerbase

Goalscorers 

 Players listed in italics left the club mid-season.
 Source: Soccerbase

Discipline

 Players listed in italics left the club mid-season.
 Source: ESPN FC

Management

Summary

Transfers & loans

Kit

|
|

Awards 
 Supporters' Player of the Year: Jay Tabb

References

Brentford F.C. seasons
Brentford